The Bauernfeld Prize or Bauernfeld-Preis was a literary prize that was awarded between 1894 and 1921 in memory of Eduard von Bauernfeld.

Laureates
1899 Arthur Schnitzler
1901 Marie Eugenie Delle Grazie
1902 Stephan von Millenkovich and 
1903 Joseph Medelsky
1904 Marie Herzfeld and Wilhelm Hegeler
1904 Hermann Hesse
1908 Karl Schönherr
1910 Fritz Stüber-Gunther
1911 Erwin Guido Kolbenheyer
1914 Max Mell
1917 Wladimir Freiherr von Hartlieb
1918 Ernst Lothar
1919 Paul Wertheimer
1920 Victor Fleischer
1921 Robert Hohlbaum and Franz Nabl
Frank Wedekind
Joseph Roth

References

Bauernfeld